The following lists events that happened during 1807 in Chile.

Incumbent
Royal Governor of Chile: Luis Muñoz de Guzmán

Events

Births
5 April - Vicente Pérez Rosales, politician (d. 1886)

Deaths

 
Chile